Lawrence Nana Asiamah Hanson, popularly known as Bullgod, is an artiste manager in Ghana. He was the long-time manager for controversial Ghanaian musician Shatta Wale before they fell out.

Career 
Bullgod began his career as a rapper before he became an artiste manager. He is the founder and the Chief executive officer of Bullhaus Entertainment which he registered as an artiste management company in 2003. He has managed Ghanaian artistes like 5Five, Nii Soul, Bertha (Yaa Yaa), Natural Face, Iwan, Rudebowy Ranking, Vanilla, VIP. Koo Ntakra and Shatta Wale.

Change of name 
In August 2020, he changed his name from 'Bulldog' to 'Bullgod' when his daughter called him 'Bullgod'. He also revealed his previous name 'Bulldog' means 'Bull Depends on God'.

Personal life 
Bullgod is married to Fiwa Hanson who is based in Germany. They have three children.

References 

Ghanaian musicians
People from Accra
Living people
Year of birth missing (living people)
Music managers